Santi Nazaro e Celso is a Romanesque-style, Roman Catholic church on the street that leads to the Porta Vescovo, in the Veronetta quartiere of Verona.

History
The site was occupied by a church by the ninth century, but since it stood outside of the city walls during medieval times, it was destroyed during the Hungarian invasions of the tenth century.

Construction began on October 13, 1464 and was completed two years later, on April 6, 1466. An inscription inside records the consecration on February 14, 1483. The bell-tower was built in 1550. The presbytery was elongated. The choir was frescoed by Paolo Farinati. In 1688, the elliptical sacristy was built. Among the highly decorated chapels, there are works by Montagna, Badile, Palma il Giovane, Mocetto, Morone, Brusasorci, Farinati and others, whilst Veronese's The Feast in the House of Simon the Pharisee originally gung in the monastery refectory.

The six bells in D are rung with Veronese bellringing art.

Bibliography

G. Borelli (1980). Chiese e monasteri di Verona. Banca popolare di Verona, Verona.
Federico dal Forno (1982). La Chiesa dei SS. Nazaro e Celso. Verona.
Guide to the churches of Verona tourist site.

Nazaro e Celso
Romanesque architecture in Verona
Gothic architecture in Verona
15th-century Roman Catholic church buildings in Italy
Roman Catholic churches completed in 1466